The Nissan S30 (sold in Japan as the Nissan Fairlady Z and in other markets as the Datsun 240Z, then later as the 260Z and 280Z) is the first generation of Z GT 3-door two-seat coupés, produced by Nissan Motors, Ltd. of Japan from 1969 until 1978. The S30 was conceived of by Yutaka Katayama, the President of Nissan Motor Corporation U.S.A. and designed by a team led by Yoshihiko Matsuo, the head of Nissan's Sports Car Styling Studio.

Aiming to compete directly with established European sports cars, Datsun priced the new 240Z within $200 of the British MGB-GT in the United States, a five-year-old design that showed its age. The 240Z's styling, engineering, relatively low price, and impressive performance resonated with the public, received a positive response from both buyers and the motoring press, and immediately generated long waiting lists.

As a halo car, the 240Z broadened the acceptance of Japanese car-makers beyond their economy image. Datsun's growing dealer network—compared to limited production imported sports cars manufactured by Jaguar, BMW, Porsche, Alfa Romeo, and Fiat—ensured both easy purchase and ready maintenance.

All variants of the S30 have four-wheel independent suspension consisting of MacPherson struts in the front (borrowed from the Nissan Laurel C30) and Chapman struts in the back. Front disc brakes and rear drums were standard.

The 240Z used twin SU-style Hitachi one-barrel side-draft carburettors. These were replaced on the 260Z with Hitachi one-barrel side-draft carburettors beginning with model year 1973 to comply with emissions regulations, resulting in diminished overall performance. A Bosch-designed L-Jetronic electronic fuel injection was added to US market 280Zs in 1975 to compensate.

Continuing through the 1975–1978 model years, markets outside of the United States (and Japan, which only offered the 2-liter engine from 1974) still received the 260Z coupé and 2+2. The S30 240Z is unrelated to the later 240SX, which is sold as the Silvia in Japan.

Fairlady Z

The Fairlady Z was introduced in late 1969 as a 1970 model, with the L20 2.0-liter straight-six SOHC engine, rear-wheel drive, and a stylish coupe body. The engine, based on the Datsun 510's four-cylinder, produced  JIS and came with a four- or a five-speed manual transmission. In Japan, the Fairlady was exclusive to Nissan Japanese dealerships called Nissan Bluebird Stores. Japanese buyers could also get the L24-engined Fairlady 240Z model (HS30), although the larger engine placed it in a considerably higher tax category. The Japanese-spec 2.4-liter engine produces a claimed  JIS at 5600 rpm but was discontinued in 1973 as sales had dropped considerably as a result of the fuel crisis, and so until the August 1978 introduction of the Fairlady 280Z only two-liter Fairladys were available.

When export models changed over to the larger 2.6-liter 260Z in 1974, only 2-liter models remained available to Japanese buyers. A Fairlady 260Z had been planned for release, but the impact of the oil crisis stopped the model, although the 260Z was available in Okinawa (which drove on the right side of the road until 1978). The Fairlady Z received all the changes as applied to the export models, including the addition of a long-wheelbase 2+2 model. Introduced in January 1974, this received the GS30 chassis code. In 1975 the L20 engine gained fuel injection to meet new emissions standards (A-S30, A-GS30) and once again provided  JIS. At the end of July 1976 the car received the NAPS system, including an EGR system, to meet the stricter yet emissions standards in effect for this year, bringing with it a change in model codes to S31 (C-S31/C-GS31). At the same time, the more luxurious Fairlady Z-T model was introduced - this was strictly an equipment level and did not include a T-bar roof, which was first seen on the succeeding generation Fairlady.

Fairlady ZG

The Japan-only HS30-H Nissan Fairlady 240ZG was released in Japan in October 1971 to homologate the 240Z for Group 4 racing. Differences between the Fairlady ZG and an export-market Datsun 240Z include an extended fiberglass "aero-dyna" nose, wider over-fenders riveted to the body, a rear spoiler, acrylic glass headlight covers and fender-mounted rear-view mirrors.

The Fairlady ZG was available in three colors: Grand Prix Red, Grand Prix White, and Grand Prix Maroon. The "G" in Fairlady ZG stands for "Grande." Although the ZG was not sold in the US and was never sold outside Japan, in order for it to be eligible for competition in the US, Nissan sold the nose kit as a dealer's option which is known as the "G-nose". With the nose added, these 240Zs are often referred to as 240ZGs outside of Japan.

Fairlady Z432

Packaging the  S20 engine (originally designed by the former Prince engineers) from the Skyline GT-R created a faster Fairlady. "Z432" referred to 4 valves per cylinder, 3 Mikuni carburetors, and 2 camshafts. The model code is PS30. Approximately 420 were built. Some Z432s were used by the police in Japan.

Fairlady Z432R
A Japan-only model Fairlady Z equipped with the twin cam 2.0 L inline six-cylinder "S20" engine shared with the KPGC10 Skyline GT-R was released in the Japanese domestic market (JDM) for homologation purposes (to enable its use as a rally car). The Z432R were all painted orange with black aluminum wheels and a low luster black hood. Z432R had lighter front guards, doors, and bonnet, as well as further engine enhancements over the Z432.

In January 2020 a 1970 Z432R sold at auction in Japan for a record , about US$.

240Z

The 1970 240Z was introduced to the American market by Yutaka Katayama, president of Nissan Motors USA operations, widely known as "Mister K". The early cars from 1969 to mid-1971 had some subtle differences compared to late-71 to 1973 cars. The most visible difference is:  these early cars had a chrome 240Z badge on the sail pillar, and two horizontal vents in the rear hatch below the glass molding providing flow through ventilation. In mid-1971, there were production changes, including exterior and interior colors, was restyling of the sail pillar emblems were with just the letter Z placed in a circular vented emblem, and the vents were eliminated from the hatch panel of the car, due to complaints of exhaust being circulated into the car. Design changes for the US model 240Z occurred throughout production but were not always reflected in the JDM Fairlady if they were specific to federal requirements, including interior modifications for the 1972 model year and a change in the location of the bumper over-riders, as well as the addition of some emission control devices and the adoption of a new style of emissions reducing carburetors for the 1973 model year. 

The 1970 models were introduced in October 1969, received the L24 2.4-liter engine with a manual choke and a four-speed manual. A less common three-speed automatic transmission was optional from 1971 on, and had a "Nissan full automatic" badge. Most export markets received the car as the "240Z", with slightly differing specifications depending on the various market needs.

In 2004, Sports Car International named this car number two on their list of Top Sports Cars of the 1970s.

Specifications
Engine:  L24 inline-six, cast iron block, alloy head, two valves per cylinder, seven-bearing crankshaft, Direct Acting OHC, compression ratio 9.0:1; Maximum recommended engine speed 7,000 rpm.
Bore X stroke: 
Fuel system: Mechanical fuel pump, twin Hitachi HJG 46W  SU-type carburetors
Power:  at 5,600 rpm (SAE gross),  DIN at 5,600 rpm
Torque:  at 4,400 rpm (SAE gross),  at 4,800 rpm (DIN)
Transmission: Four-speed manual, five-speed manual, or three-speed automatic (after September 1970)
Final drive ratios:
Four-speed manual transmission: 3.364:1 (37:11)
Five-speed manual transmission: 3.90:1 (39:10) (not available in US)
Three-speed automatic transmission: 3.545:1 (39:11).
Brakes:
Front:  discs
Rear:  x  drums
Suspension:
Front: Independent with MacPherson struts, lower transverse and drag links, coil springs, telescopic dampers, anti-roll bar
Rear: Independent with Chapman struts, lower wishbones, coil springs, telescopic dampers
Steering: Rack and pinion, 2.7 turns lock to lock
Wheels: 4.5J-14 steel wheels with 175SR14 tires
Top speed: 
0 to : 8.0 s
Typical fuel consumption:

World Rally Championship - round victories
In 1973, a 240Z, in the hands of Shekhar Mehta, won the 21st East African Safari Rally.

{|class="wikitable" style="font-size: 95%; "

! No.
! Event
! Season
! Driver
! Co-driver
! Car
|-
| 1
|  21st East African Safari Rally
| 1973
|  Shekhar Mehta
|  Lofty Drews
| Datsun 240Z
|}

260Z

The 260Z was sold in the United States for the 1974 model year only, but was available in other countries until 1978 (aside from Japan, where this model was never regularly available except for in Okinawa). The engine was enlarged to 2.6 L by lengthening its stroke bringing with it the new model code RS30. There was also a 1974.5 model sold through the second half of 1974 in the US that had the full 165 hp with the addition of the larger 5 mph safety bumpers, that would become the standard for the 280Z.

A four-speed or 5 speed (non US) manual remained standard equipment, with a three-speed automatic transmission optional.

A 2+2 model built on a  longer wheelbase was introduced, with larger opening quarter panel windows and a slightly notched roofline. The 2+2 looked largely identical inside (aside from the rear seat and its associated seat belt reels), but did receive a carpeted transmission tunnel rather than the quilted vinyl material used on the two-seater. The rear side windows on the 2+2 were push-out units, to add ventilation for rear seat occupants.

The 260Z claimed a few updates and improvements over the 240Z. The climate controls were more sensibly laid out and easier to work, and those cars with air conditioning now had the A/C system integrated into the main climate control panel. There was also additional stiffness in the chassis due to a redesign of the chassis rails which were larger and extended further back than previous models. A rear sway bar was added as well. The 260Z debuted a redesigned dashboard and console, as well as new seat trim, and door panels for the interior. The tail lights were updated, moving the back up lights from the main tail light housing to the back panel. Early 1974 US 260Z models had bumpers that resembled those of the earlier 240Z, though increased slightly in size, pushed away from the body somewhat, and wearing black rubber bumper guards rather that the previous chrome bumper guards with rubber strips. These early cars still had the front turn signals located below the bumpers. Late 1974 U.S. 260Z models (often referred to as 1974.5 models) carried the heavier bumpers that would remain on the 1975-76 model years of the 280Z so as to be in compliance with United States bumper legislation in 1973. These late cars had the front turn signals relocated to the outer edges of the front grill, above the bumper.

Specifications
Engine:  L26 I6, cast-iron block, alloy head, two valve per cylinder, seven-bearing crankshaft, single overhead camshaft
Displacement: 
Bore:	
Stroke: 
Compression ratio: 8.8:1
Fuel system: Mechanical fuel pump, twin Hitachi HMB 46W  SU-type carburetors
Power:	 at 5,600 rpm (SAE gross);  at 5,200 rpm (SAE net)
Torque:  at 4,400 rpm (SAE gross);  at 4,400 rpm (SAE net)
Transmission: five-speed or four-speed manual or three-speed automatic
Brakes:
Front:  discs front
Rear:  X  drums rear, servo assisted
Total swept area: 
Suspension:
Front: Independent with MacPherson struts, lower wishbones, coil springs, telescopic dampers, anti-roll bar
Rear:	Independent with Chapman struts, lower wishbones, coil springs, telescopic dampers
Steering:	rack and pinion, 2.8 turns lock to lock
Wheels/ tires:	 pressed steel wheels with 195VR14 radial tyres
Top speed: 
0 to : 8.0 sec
Fuel consumption: 
Engine oil (sump): 
Tare weight:  (2+2 Automatic)

280Z

Nissan released the Datsun 280Z model for the North American market in the 1975 model year. In a further effort to keep the S30 models sporting in the face of increasingly stringent U.S. emission and safety requirements, engine size was again increased, this time to 2.8 liters. The L26 engine was bored out  to create the L28, and a Bosch L-Jetronic fuel injection system was added. Canadian versions were uniquely equipped without the anti-smog components mandatory in the States. The model code is HS30, the same as for the original 240Z.

The 1975 and 1976 models continued to be fitted with the U.S. federally-required  impact absorbing bumpers that had been introduced for the mid-1974 model year of the 260Z. These bumpers were smooth surfaced, and blended into smooth black rubber extensions as they met the body of the car. The 1977 and 1978 models received bumpers with recessed channels added that blended into corrugated- or accordion-style black rubber extension trim. Also new for the 1977 model year, 280Zs no longer received the full-size spare tire, and instead had a "space saver" spare and a larger fuel tank. This resulted in a raised rear deck area made of fiberboard, reducing cargo space. In late 1976 and for most 1977–78 models, an optional five-speed manual transmission was available alongside the four-speed manual and the three-speed automatic options. It included a "5-speed" emblem on the left bottom edge of the rear hatch.  For 1977 there was also an update from the charcoal painted hubcap style (with a chrome Z floating in the amber center emblems) to a hubcap that resembled an alloy wheel, bearing a center cap with a chrome Z floating in a black circle.

In 1977 and 1978 respectively, Datsun offered two special edition models. The "Zap" edition was offered in 1977 as a "special decor package". Zap cars were finished in "sunshine yellow" paint, and sported black stripes down the center and sides, with yellow, red, and orange chevrons at the front ends of the stripes. An estimated 1,000 "Zap Z" cars were offered in 1977. The "Zap Z" model was also used as the pace car in the 1977 Long Beach Grand Prix. The Black Pearl edition (produced in 1978) came with black pearlescent paint and a "special appearance package" (SAP), which consisted of dual racing mirrors, rear window louvers, and  unique red and silver striping.  It has been estimated that each United States dealer was allocated one Black Pearl edition to sell, though due to high demand some dealers reportedly received additional allocation. It is estimated 750 to 1,500 of these cars were ultimately produced, however the exact number remains unknown.

Both the two-seater and 2+2 280Z coupes remained available throughout the 1975–1978 model year run. The S30 series was replaced for 1979 by the Nissan S130.

Specifications
Engine: L28E I6, cast-iron block, alloy head, seven-bearing crankshaft, single overhead camshaft
Displacement:  
Bore:	
Stroke: 
Fuel system: electric fuel pump, Bosch L-Jetronic fuel injection
Compression ratio: 8.3:1
Power:  at 5,600 rpm (SAE gross)
Torque:  at 4,400 rpm
Transmission: four-speed manual, five-speed manual, three-speed automatic
Final drive ratio: 3.55:1

Racing

The Z was very successful in SCCA racing in the 1970s: Bob Sharp Racing out of Wilton, Connecticut with Sharp, Elliot Forbes-Robinson and later Paul Newman driving; and Brock Racing Enterprises (BRE) in the western US with John Morton driving a #46 240Z to the SCCA C Production national title in 1970 and 1971. Other drivers, such as Clearwater Florida (and later Maryland) racer Don Kearney had much success with the Z-car between 1970 and 1978. The Z and Datsun 510 are credited as catalyst for the US Japanese import performance parts industry. Nissan also supported and was associated with Bob Bondurant's race driving school from its inception.

In 2013 Nissan claimed its 97th SCCA national championship victory with Greg Ira at the wheel of his orange #2 RevTech 240Z. On his way to his championship Ira set several road course records in SCCA's E Production class, beginning in 2006, including:

Daytona International Speedway, Florida
Heartland Park, Kansas
Homestead-Miami Speedway, Florida
Palm Beach International Raceway, Florida
Road America, Wisconsin
Sebring International Raceway, Florida
Virginia International Raceway, Virginia

Ira was awarded SCCA's prestigious Kimberly Cup in 2008. Previous Kimberly Cup recipients include Bob Holbert, Roger Penske, Mark Donohue, and Peter Revson.

On September 27, 2015, Greg Ira won his second (and Nissan's 98th) SCCA National Championship, in his EP2 Revtech/Ztrix.com 240Z, at Daytona International Speedway.

Relaunch attempts
From 1997 to 2002 Nissan did not offer the Z-car line outside of Japan, where the Fairlady Z (Z32) remained available until 2000. In 1998, Nissan launched a program to bring back the Z-car line by first purchasing original 240Zs, then restoring them to factory specifications, and finally selling them to dealerships for $24,000. This was an effort to keep Z-car interest alive. Nissan over-estimated the market for the cars and low demand (and the high price) meant that less than fifty cars were re-manufactured and sold.  Furthermore, in 1999, a concept car was shown to the public in a plan to return to the fundamentals that made the 240Z a market success.

See also

Datsun Sports
Nissan L engine
Nissan Z-car
Yutaka Katayama
Wangan Midnight

References

Notes

Sources

Datsun Z: From Fairlady to 280Z, Brian Long, Motorbooks International 1998

External links

Classic Z Register
listing for 240Z at IMCDb
listing for 260Z at IMCDb
listing for 280Z at IMCDb

Sports cars
Rear-wheel-drive vehicles
Rally cars
Cars introduced in 1969
1970s cars
240Z-280ZX